The 2016–17 Minnesota Timberwolves season was the 28th season of the franchise in the National Basketball Association (NBA). On April 20, 2016, the Timberwolves hired Tom Thibodeau as their new head coach. On September 23, 2016, Kevin Garnett would officially retire from the NBA, thus ending his 21-year career in the process. On April 11, 2017, the Timberwolves would unveil a new logo and new uniforms to enter the next season. They improved their 29–53 output from the previous season, but missed the playoffs for the 13th consecutive season, tying the record for the longest playoff drought in NBA history.

Draft

Roster

Standings

Division

Conference

Game log

Pre-season

|- style="background:#bfb;"
| 1
| October 8
| @ Miami
| 109–100
| Karl-Anthony Towns (20)
| Karl-Anthony Towns (10)
| Kris Dunn (7)
| American Airlines Arena13,042
| 1–0
|- style="background:#fbb;"
| 2
| October 10
| @ Charlotte
| 86–98
| Zach LaVine (30)
| Cole Aldrich (9)
| Kris Dunn (3)
| Spectrum Center8,424
| 1–1
|- style="background-color:#bfb;"
| 3
| October 12
| Denver
| 105–88
| Muhammad, Towns, Wiggins (18)
| Karl-Anthony Towns (8)
| Ricky Rubio (8)
| Pinnacle Bank Arena7,153
| 2–1
|- style="background:#bfb;"
| 4
| October 15
| @ Miami
| 101–96
| Andrew Wiggins (23)
| Karl-Anthony Towns (14)
| Ricky Rubio (6)
| KFC Yum! Center9,672
| 3–1
|- style="background:#fbb;"
| 5
| October 16
| @ Oklahoma City
| 94–112
| John Lucas III (18)
| Aldrich, Bjelica, Hill (6)
| Kris Dunn (6)
| Chesapeake Energy Arena10,489
| 3–2
|- style="background:#bfb;"
| 6
| October 19
| Memphis
| 101–94
| Karl-Anthony Towns (31)
| Gorgui Dieng (11)
| Ricky Rubio (7)
| Target Center9,594
| 4–2
|- style="background:#bfb;"
| 7
| October 21
| Charlotte
| 109–74
| Shabazz Muhammad (17)
| Karl-Anthony Towns (9)
| Ricky Rubio (6)
| Target Center9,708
| 5–2

Regular season

|- style="background:#fcc"
| 1
| October 26
| @ Memphis
| 
| Andrew Wiggins (25)
| Gorgui Dieng (14)
| Ricky Rubio (8)
| FedExForum18,119
| 0–1
|- style="background:#fcc"
| 2
| October 29
| @ Sacramento
| 
| Andrew Wiggins (29)
| Gorgui Dieng (13)
| Ricky Rubio (5)
| Golden 1 Center17,608
| 0–2

|- style="background:#cfc"
| 3
| November 1
| Memphis
| 
| Zach LaVine (31)
| Karl-Anthony Towns (10)
| Kris Dunn (6)
| Target Center14,774
| 1–2
|- style="background:#fcc"
| 4
| November 3
| Denver
| 
| Karl-Anthony Towns (32)
| Karl-Anthony Towns (14)
| Kris Dunn (9)
| Target Center11,219
| 1–3
|- style="background:#fcc;"
| 5
| November 5
| @ Oklahoma City
| 
| Karl-Anthony Towns (33)
| Gorgui Dieng (8)
| Tyus Jones (4)
| Chesapeake Energy Arena18,203
| 1–4
|- style="background:#fcc"
| 6
| November 8
| @ Brooklyn
| 
| Andrew Wiggins (36)
| Andrew Wiggins (8)
| Tyus Jones (7)
| Barclays Center13,610
| 1–5
|- style="background:#cfc;"
| 7
| November 9
| @ Orlando
| 
| Zach LaVine (37)
| Towns, Dieng (11)
| Gorgui Dieng (7)
| Amway Center17,102
| 2–5
|- style="background:#fcc"
| 8
| November 12
| L.A. Clippers
| 
| Karl-Anthony Towns (24)
| Karl-Anthony Towns (10)
| Ricky Rubio (6)
| Target Center14,494
| 2–6
|- style="background:#cfc"
| 9
| November 13
| L.A. Lakers
| 
| Andrew Wiggins (47)
| Karl-Anthony Towns (12)
| Ricky Rubio (10)
| Target Center14,432
| 3–6
|- style="background:#fcc"
| 10
| November 15
| Charlotte
| 
| Andrew Wiggins (29)
| Gorgui Dieng (11)
| Ricky Rubio (8)
| Target Center10,349
| 3–7
|- style="background:#cfc"
| 11
| November 17
| Philadelphia
| 
| Andrew Wiggins (35)
| Dieng, Towns,  Wiggins (10)
| Ricky Rubio (5)
| Target Center16,866
| 4–7
|- style="background:#fcc"
| 12
| November 19
| @ Memphis
| 
| Zach LaVine (22)
| Gorgui Dieng (11)
| Ricky Rubio (7)
| FedExForum17,112
| 4–8
|- style="background:#fcc"
| 13
| November 21
| Boston
| 
| Karl-Anthony Towns (27)
| Karl-Anthony Towns (18)
| Ricky Rubio (9)
| Target Center13,167
| 4–9
|- style="background:#fcc"
| 14
| November 23
| @ New Orleans
| 
| Zach LaVine (26)
| Karl-Anthony Towns (11)
| Rubio, Dieng (5)
| Smoothie King Center15,555
| 4–10
|- style="background:#cfc"
| 15
| November 25
| @ Phoenix
| 
| Andrew Wiggins (25)
| Karl-Anthony Towns (10)
| Rubio, Towns (4)
| Talking Stick Resort Arena16,728
| 5–10
|- style="background:#fcc"
| 16
| November 26
| @ Golden State
| 
| Zach LaVine (31)
| Karl-Anthony Towns (9)
| Ricky Rubio (7)
| Oracle Arena19,596
| 5–11
|- style="background:#fcc"
| 17
| November 28
| Utah
| 
| Zach LaVine (28)
| Karl-Anthony Towns (12)
| Zach LaVine (8)
| Target Center9,384
| 5–12
|- style="background:#fcc"
| 18
| November 30
| New York
| 
| Karl-Anthony Towns (47)
| Karl-Anthony Towns (18)
| Ricky Rubio (6)
| Target Center13,987
| 5–13

|-style="background:#fcc"
| 19
| December 2
| @ New York
| 
| Zach LaVine (23)
| Cole Aldrich (12)
| Ricky Rubio (6)
| Madison Square Garden19,812
| 5–14
|-style="background:#cfc"
| 20
| December 3
| @ Charlotte
| 
| Andrew Wiggins (29)
| Karl-Anthony Towns (15)
| Ricky Rubio (12)
| Spectrum Center16,982
| 6–14
|- style="background:#fcc"
| 21
| December 6
| San Antonio
| 
| Zach LaVine (25)
| Karl-Anthony Towns (14)
| Ricky Rubio (6)
| Target Center12,585
| 6–15
|- style="background:#fcc"
| 22
| December 8
| @ Toronto
| 
| Zach LaVine (29)
| Karl-Anthony Towns (11)
| Zach LaVine (6)
| Air Canada Centre19,800
| 6–16
|- style="background:#fcc"
| 23
| December 9
| Detroit
| 
| Andrew Wiggins (16)
| Karl-Anthony Towns (12)
| Ricky Rubio (6)
| Target Center14,109
| 6–17
|- style="background:#fcc"
| 24
| December 11
| Golden State
| 
| Wiggins, Towns, LaVine (25)
| Karl-Anthony Towns (18)
| Ricky Rubio (6)
| Target Center 18,452
| 6−18
|- style="background:#cfc"
| 25
| December 13
| @ Chicago
| 
| Zach LaVine (24)
| Karl-Anthony Towns (12)
| Ricky Rubio (10)
| United Center21,146
| 7–18
|- style="background:#fcc"
| 26
| December 17
| Houston
| 
| Karl-Anthony Towns (41)
| Karl-Anthony Towns (15)
| Ricky Rubio (7)
| Target Center14,689
| 7–19
|- style="background:#cfc"
| 27
| December 19
| Phoenix
| 
| Karl-Anthony Towns (28)
| Karl-Anthony Towns (15)
| Ricky Rubio (12)
| Target Center12,008
| 8–19
|- style="background:#cfc"
| 28
| December 21
| @ Atlanta
| 
| Andrew Wiggins (19)
| Karl-Anthony Towns (18)
| Ricky Rubio (8)
| Philips Arena17,578
| 9–19
|- style="background:#fcc"
| 29
| December 23
| Sacramento
| 
| Zach LaVine (40)
| Karl-Anthony Towns (13)
| Ricky Rubio (8)
| Target Center13,288
| 9–20
|- style="background:#fcc"
| 30
| December 25
| @ Oklahoma City
| 
| Karl-Anthony Towns (26)
| Karl-Anthony Towns (8)
| Ricky Rubio (10)
| Chesapeake Energy Arena18,203
| 9–21
|- style="background:#cfc"
| 31
| December 26
| Atlanta
| 
| Karl-Anthony Towns (22)
| Karl-Anthony Towns (11)
| Ricky Rubio (10)
| Target Center15,617
| 10–21
|- style="background:#fcc"
| 32
| December 28
| @ Denver
| 
| Andrew Wiggins (25)
| Karl-Anthony Towns (11)
| Karl-Anthony Towns (10)
| Pepsi Center15,093
| 10–22
|- style="background:#cfc"
| 33
| December 30
| Milwaukee
| 
| Andrew Wiggins (31)
| Karl-Anthony Towns (16)
| Ricky Rubio (9)
| Target Center17,779
| 11–22

|- style="background:#fcc;"
| 34
| January 1
| Portland
| 
| Andrew Wiggins (24)
| Karl-Anthony Towns (13)
| Towns, Rubio (6)
| Target Center15,804
| 11–23
|- style="background:#fcc;"
| 35
| January 3
| @ Philadelphia
| 
| Zach LaVine (28)
| Karl-Anthony Towns (13)
| Towns, Rubio (5)
| Wells Fargo Center17,124
| 11–24
|- style="background:#fcc;"
| 36
| January 6
| @ Washington
| 
| Andrew Wiggins (41)
| Gorgui Dieng (11)
| Ricky Rubio (7)
| Verizon Center18,686
| 11–25
|- style="background:#fcc;"
| 37
| January 7
| Utah
| 
| Zach LaVine (24)
| Karl-Anthony Towns (12)
| Ricky Rubio (7)
| Target Center13,945
| 11–26
|- style="background:#cfc;"
| 38
| January 9
| Dallas
| 
| Karl-Anthony Towns (34)
| Karl-Anthony Towns (11)
| Ricky Rubio (15)
| Target Center9,625
| 12–26
|- style="background:#cfc;"
| 39
| January 11
| Houston
| 
| Andrew Wiggins (28)
| Karl-Anthony Towns (18)
| Ricky Rubio (17)
| Target Center9,625
| 13–26
|- style="background:#cfc;"
| 40
| January 13
| Oklahoma City
| 
| Karl-Anthony Towns (29)
| Karl-Anthony Towns (17)
| Ricky Rubio (14)
| Target Center16,644
| 14–26
|- style="background:#fcc;"
| 41
| January 15
| @ Dallas
| 
| Gorgui Dieng (21)
| Karl-Anthony Towns (9)
| Ricky Rubio (10)
| American Airlines Center19,655
| 14–27
|-style="background:#fcc;"
| 42
| January 17
| @ San Antonio
| 
| Karl-Anthony Towns (27)
| Karl-Anthony Towns (16)
| Ricky Rubio (14)
| AT&T Center18,418
| 14–28
|-style="background:#cfc;"
| 43
| January 19
| @ LA Clippers
| 
| Karl-Anthony Towns (37)
| Karl-Anthony Towns (12)
| Karl-Anthony Towns (5)
| Staples Center19,060
| 15–28
|- style="background:#cfc;"
| 44
| January 22
| Denver
| 
| Karl-Anthony Towns (32)
| Karl-Anthony Towns (12)
| Kris Dunn (9)
| Target Center12,788
| 16–28
|- style="background:#cfc;"
| 45
| January 24
| @ Phoenix
| 
| Andrew Wiggins (31)
| Karl-Anthony Towns (10)
| Ricky Rubio (10)
| Talking Stick Resort Arena17,241
| 17–28
|- style="background:#fcc;"
| 46
| January 26
| Indiana
| 
| Karl-Anthony Towns (23)
| Karl-Anthony Towns (10)
| Ricky Rubio (12)
| Target Center14,862
| 17–29
|- style="background:#cfc;"
| 47
| January 28
| Brooklyn
| 
| Karl-Anthony Towns (37)
| Karl-Anthony Towns (13)
| Kris Dunn (7)
| Target Center14,798
| 18–29
|- style="background:#cfc;"
| 48
| January 30
| Orlando
| 
| Andrew Wiggins (27)
| Gorgui Dieng (14)
| Ricky Rubio (12)
| Target Center11,124
| 19–29

|- style= "background:#fcc;"
| 49
| February 1
| @ Cleveland
| 
| Karl-Anthony Towns (26)
| Karl-Anthony Towns (12)
| Ricky Rubio (14)
| Quicken Loans Arena 20,562
| 19–30
|- style= "background:#fcc;"
| 50
| February 3
| @ Detroit
| 
| Karl-Anthony Towns (24)
| Gorgui Dieng (12)
| Ricky Rubio (7)
| The Palace of Auburn Hills 16,934
| 19–31
|- style= "background:#fcc;"
| 51
| February 4
| Memphis
| 
| Karl-Anthony Towns (27)
| Karl-Anthony Towns (16)
| Rubio, Jones (6)
| Target Center 15,081
| 19–32
|- style= "background:#fcc;"
| 52
| February 6
| Miami
| 
| Karl-Anthony Towns (35)
| Karl-Anthony Towns (8)
| Ricky Rubio (13)
| Target Center 12,502
| 19–33
|- style= "background:#cfc;"
| 53
| February 8
| Toronto
| 
| Andrew Wiggins (31)
| Karl-Anthony Towns (14)
| Ricky Rubio (7)
| Target Center 13,832
| 20–33
|- style= "background:#fcc;"
| 54
| February 10
| New Orleans
| 
| Karl-Anthony Towns (36)
| Dieng, Towns (8)
| Ricky Rubio (12)
| Target Center 16,093
| 20–34
|- style= "background:#cfc;"
| 55
| February 12
| Chicago
| 
| Andrew Wiggins (27)
| Gorgui Dieng (13)
| Ricky Rubio (11)
| Target Center 19,356
| 21–34
|- style= "background:#fcc;"
| 56
| February 14
| Cleveland
| 
| Andrew Wiggins (41)
| Gorgui Dieng (10)
| Ricky Rubio (16)
| Target Center17,738
| 21–35
|- style= "background:#cfc;"
| 57
| February 15
| @ Denver
| 
| Andrew Wiggins (40)
| Karl-Anthony Towns (19)
| Rubio, Dunn (5)
| Pepsi Center13,924
| 22–35
|- style= "background:#cfc;"
| 58
| February 24
| Dallas
| 
| Andrew Wiggins (27)
| Karl-Anthony Towns (18)
| Ricky Rubio  (14)
| Target Center15,948
| 23–35
|- style="background:#fcc;"
| 59
| February 25
| @ Houston
| 
| Karl-Anthony Towns (37)
| Karl-Anthony Towns (22)
| Ricky Rubio  (11)
| Toyota Center18,055
| 23–36
|-style="background:#cfc;"
| 60
| February 27
| @ Sacramento
| 
| Karl-Anthony Towns (29)
| Karl-Anthony Towns (17)
| Ricky Rubio (11)
| Golden 1 Center17,608
| 24–36

|- style="background:#cfc;"
| 61
| March 1
| @ Utah
| 
| Karl-Anthony Towns (21)
| Karl-Anthony Towns (15)
| Ricky Rubio (9)
| Vivint Smart Home Arena19,590
| 25–36
|- style="background:#fcc;"
| 62
| March 4
| @ San Antonio
| 
| Karl-Anthony Towns (24)
| Karl-Anthony Towns (14)
| Ricky Rubio (10)
| AT&T Center18,418
| 25–37
|- style="background:#cfc;"
| 63
| March 8
| L. A. Clippers
| 
| Karl-Anthony Towns (29)
| Karl-Anthony Towns (14)
| Ricky Rubio (12)
| Target Center14,933
| 26–37
|- style="background:#cfc;"
| 64
| March 10
| Golden State
| 
| Andrew Wiggins (24)
| Nemanja Bjelica (12)
| Ricky Rubio (13)
| Target Center20,412
| 27−37
|- style="background:#fcc;"
| 65
| March 11
| @ Milwaukee
| 
| Karl-Anthony Towns (35)
| Karl-Anthony Towns (14)
| Ricky Rubio (8)
| Bradley Center18,717
| 27–38
|- style="background:#cfc;"
| 66
| March 13
| Washington
| 
| Karl-Anthony Towns (39)
| Karl-Anthony Towns (13)
| Ricky Rubio (19)
| Target Center15,747
| 28–38
|- style="background:#fcc;"
| 67
| March 15
| @ Boston
| 
| Ricky Rubio (23)
| Karl-Anthony Towns (14)
| Ricky Rubio (7)
| TD Garden18,624
| 28–39
|- style="background:#fcc;"
| 68
| March 17
| @ Miami
| 
| Karl-Anthony Towns (31)
| Karl-Anthony Towns (11)
| Ricky Rubio (6)
| American Airlines Arena19,600
| 28–40
|- style="background:#fcc;"
| 69
| March 19
| @ New Orleans
| 
| Karl-Anthony Towns (33)
| Gorgui Dieng (10)
| Ricky Rubio (14)
| Smoothie King Center16,111
| 28–41
|- style="background:#fcc;"
| 70
| March 21
| San Antonio
| 
| Karl-Anthony Towns (25)
| Karl-Anthony Towns (14)
| Ricky Rubio (7)
| Target Center13,742
| 28–42
|- style="background:#fcc;"
| 71
| March 24
| @ L.A. Lakers
| 
| Andrew Wiggins (36)
| Karl-Anthony Towns (13)
| Ricky Rubio (15)
| Staples Center18,997
| 28–43
|- style="background:#fcc;"
| 72
| March 25
| @ Portland
| 
| Andrew Wiggins (20)
| Gorgui Dieng (7)
| Rubio, Jones (4)
| Moda Center19,580
| 28–44
|- style="background:#cfc;"
| 73
| March 28
| @ Indiana
| 
| Karl-Anthony Towns (37)
| Karl-Anthony Towns (12)
| Ricky Rubio (10)
| Bankers Life Fieldhouse17,534
| 29–44
|- style="background:#cfc;"
| 74
| March 30
| L.A. Lakers
| 
| Ricky Rubio (33)
| Gorgui Dieng (15)
| Ricky Rubio (10)
| Target Center18,179
| 30–44

|- style="background:#fcc;"
| 75
| April 1
| Sacramento
| 
| Andrew Wiggins (32)
| Karl-Anthony Towns (11)
| Ricky Rubio (13)
| Target Center18,960
| 30–45
|- style="background:#cfc;"
| 76
| April 3
| Portland
| 
| Karl-Anthony Towns (34)
| Karl-Anthony Towns (12)
| Ricky Rubio (16)
| Target Center14,677
| 31–45
|- style="background:#fcc;"
| 77
| April 4
| @ Golden State
| 
| Muhammad, Wiggins (24)
| Shabazz Muhammad (11)
| Ricky Rubio (5)
| Oracle Arena19,596
| 31−46
|- style="background:#fcc;"
| 78
| April 6
| @ Portland
| 
| Andrew Wiggins (36)
| Karl-Anthony Towns (16)
| Ricky Rubio (5)
| Moda Center19,393
| 31–47
|- style="background:#fcc;"
| 79
| April 7
| @ Utah
| 
| Karl-Anthony Towns (32)
| Karl-Anthony Towns (13)
| Ricky Rubio (12)
| Vivint Smart Home Arena19,911
| 31–48
|- style="background:#fcc;"
| 80
| April 9
| @ L.A. Lakers
| 
| Andrew Wiggins (41)
| Karl-Anthony Towns (21)
| Ricky Rubio (11)
| Staples Center18,997
| 31–49
|- style="background:#fcc;"
| 81
| April 11
| Oklahoma City
| 
| Karl-Anthony Towns (26)
| Karl-Anthony Towns (12)
| Ricky Rubio (10)
| Target Center19,356
| 31–50
|- style="background:#fcc;"
| 82
| April 12
| @ Houston
| 
| Karl-Anthony Towns (28)
| Karl-Anthony Towns (21)
| Kris Dunn (16)
| Toyota Center18,055
| 31–51

Transactions

Free agents

Re-signed

Additions

Subtractions

References

2016-17
2016–17 NBA season by team
2016 in sports in Minnesota
2017 in sports in Minnesota